Nasirabad (also Romanized as Naşīrābād) is a village in Dasht Rural District, in the Central District of Meshgin Shahr County, Ardabil Province, Iran. At the 2006 census, its population was 1,286, in 331 families.

References 

Towns and villages in Meshgin Shahr County